VAM may refer to:

Science and technology 
 Vinyl acetate monomer, a chemical component used in plastics manufacture
 VAM (bicycling), a measure of rate of climb in bicycle racing
 Vehículos Automotores Mexicanos, a Mexican automaker
 VAM, a trademark of Vallourec Oil and Gas, France
 Virtual Antenna Mapping, a method used in wireless telecom products
 Vesicular Arbuscular Mycorhiza, a kind of fungus/plant symbiosis

Other uses 
 Value-added modeling, an American method of teacher evaluation
 Victoria and Albert Museum in London
 Violence against men
  Vitt Ariskt Motstånd or White Aryan Resistance (Sweden), a Swedish neo-nazi group
 Villa International Airport Maamigili (IATA code: VAM)
 Vanimo language (ISO 639 code: vam)

See also
 VAMM - Virtual atom molecular mechanics, see Force field (chemistry)